For millennia, the Greeks in Israel have been prominently present in the land. Greek expatriates comprise most of the leadership of the Eastern Greek Orthodox Church in Israel and the Palestinian Territories, in an arrangement that long predates the modern State of Israel.

History

Classic period
In the late 330s BCE, Alexander the Great invaded the Middle East (including the area which is now Israel), during his campaigns against the Achaemenid Empire. The landscape during this period was markedly changed by extensive growth and development that included urban planning and the establishment of well-built fortified cities. Hellenistic pottery, trade and commerce flourished, particularly in the most Hellenized areas, such as Ashkelon, Jaffa, Jerusalem, Gaza, and ancient Nablus (Tell Balatah).

When the Hasmonean Kingdom was absorbed into the Roman Empire, the area remained under the influence of the Greek language and culture. Especially when the Byzantine Empire took the position of the Romans, Palaestina reached its greatest prosperity in antiquity. Urbanization increased, large new areas were put under cultivation, monasteries proliferated and synagogues were restored. The cities of Palaestina Prima and Teria, such as Caesarea Maritima, Jerusalem, Scythopolis, Neapolis, and Gaza reached their peak population, and the population west of the Jordan may have reached as many as one million.

Middle Ages
Since the 7th century, when the Arabs conquered the region, the Greek presence was reduced. Today there is a small Greek community in Israel. Also, there are Greeks in charge of the Greek Orthodox Patriarchate of Jerusalem. There is also a large number of Romaniote and Sephardic Greek Jews who emigrated from Greece and live now in Israel, some of whom made aliyah over the previous centuries, with most moving to Israel after Israeli independence.

Modern era
During the WWII some of the Greek community went to Greece voluntarily to fight against the Axis powers.

Notable people
 Salamo Arouch, boxer
 Ofir Akunis, politician
 Yehuda Poliker, singer and musician 
 Aris San, singer and nightclub owner who popularized Greek music in Israel
 Patriarch Irenaios
 Patriarch Theophilos III of Jerusalem

See also

Greek Colony, Jerusalem
Greece–Israel relations
Greek Orthodox Patriarch of Jerusalem
Greek music in Israel

References

External links

Ethnic groups in Israel
Greek diaspora in the Middle East